is a retired Japanese professional outfielder.

External links

Living people
1973 births
Baseball people from Osaka Prefecture
Japanese baseball players
Meiji University alumni
Nippon Professional Baseball outfielders
Nippon Ham Fighters players
Hanshin Tigers players
Japanese baseball coaches
Nippon Professional Baseball coaches
People from Sakai, Osaka